Moise Nkounkou (born 2 August 1996) is a Congolese professional footballer who plays for Hafia FC as well as the Congo national team.

International career
In January 2014, coach Claude Leroy, invited him to be a part of the Congo squad for the 2014 African Nations Championship. The team was eliminated in the group stages after losing to Ghana, drawing with Libya and defeating Ethiopia.

Honours

Tirana
 Albanian Cup: 2016–17

References

External links
Moise Nkounkou at Footballdatabase

1996 births
Living people
Republic of the Congo footballers
2014 African Nations Championship players
Republic of the Congo A' international footballers
Étoile du Congo players
AC Léopards players
KF Tirana players
CSMD Diables Noirs players
Daring Club Motema Pembe players
Expatriate footballers in Albania
Republic of the Congo expatriate sportspeople in Albania
Association football midfielders
Republic of the Congo international footballers
Republic of the Congo expatriate sportspeople in the Democratic Republic of the Congo
Republic of the Congo expatriate sportspeople in Guinea
Expatriate footballers in Guinea
Expatriate footballers in the Democratic Republic of the Congo
2018 African Nations Championship players
Hafia FC players